Paul Aldread (6 November 1946 – 2014) was an English professional footballer who played in the Football League for Mansfield Town.

References

1946 births
2014 deaths
English footballers
Association football forwards
English Football League players
Corby Town F.C. players
Mansfield Town F.C. players
Ashfield United F.C. players